Estadio Antonio José de Sucre is a stadium in Puerto Ayacucho, Venezuela. It has a capacity of 10,000 spectators.  It is the home of Tucanes de Amazonas of the Venezuelan Segunda División.

References

Football venues in Venezuela
Buildings and structures in Amazonas (Venezuelan state)
Buildings and structures in Puerto Ayacucho
Athletics (track and field) venues in Venezuela